Never Never Land  is a 1980 British drama film directed by Paul Annett and starring Petula Clark, Cathleen Nesbitt, John Castle, and Anne Seymour. It is named after Neverland, the magical setting of the classic children's tales of Peter Pan.

Plot synopsis
Seven-year-old Jennie (Heather Miller) has been abandoned by her parents and left in the care of her aunt Bee (Petula Clark) and uncle Jim (John Castle).  Jennie is treated poorly by her two elder cousins, and taking her lead from the story Peter and Wendy, she runs away from home with her younger cousin Joe (Christian Henson).  She finds shelter in an abandoned London townhouse occupied by a gang of young ruffians, and becomes the equivalent of Wendy, role-playing "mother" to the Lost Boys.  An old woman named Edith Forbes (Cathleen Nesbitt, in her final screen performance) befriends the girl.

Cast
Petula Clark as Bee
Cathleen Nesbitt as Edith Forbes
Anne Seymour as Zena
Michael J. Shannon as Peter
John Castle as Jim
Heather Miller as Jennie
Christian Henson as Joe
Evelyn Laye as Millie
Roland Culver as Mr. Salford
James Marcus as P.C. Stubbs

Reception
Produced by actress Diane Baker, it was unsuccessful in the UK and received a limited commercial release in the US. It was later broadcast by HBO in the mid-1980s.

The film's theme song "Fly Away" was composed by Jane McNealy and Alice Kuhns. It is included on The Petula Clark Anthology: Downtown to Sunset Boulevard, a CD released in 2000.

External links
 

1980 films
1980 drama films
Films shot at EMI-Elstree Studios
British drama films
Films scored by Ron Grainer
1980s English-language films
1980s British films